In shogi, Sleeve Rook (袖飛車 sodebisha, also translated as Right Third File Rook, Sideways Rook or Sidestepped Rook) is a Static Rook opening in which the rook is moved to the third file if played by Black or the seventh file if played by White.

Aside from being its own opening, a Sleeve Rook formation is used in some variations of several different openings. For instance, there are Sleeve Rook variations of the Double Fortress and of different Static Rook vs Ranging Rook openings.

History

The Sleeve Rook opening is one of the oldest shogi openings appearing around the same time as the Black's Static Rook vs White's Traditional Ranging Rook type of openings and the Wrong Diagonal Bishop (thus predating other old openings such as Fortress, etc).

Hon'inbō is playing a Sleeve Rook position against Ōhashi's Static Rook.

See also

 Static Rook

Bibliography

References

Shogi openings
Static Rook openings